Yevgeni Fyodorovich Shipitsin (born 16 January 1985) is a Russian former professional football player.

References

External links
 

1985 births
Sportspeople from Perm, Russia
Living people
Russian footballers
Association football midfielders
FC Salyut Belgorod players
FC Sokol Saratov players
FC Krasnodar players
Russian Premier League players
FC Mordovia Saransk players
FC Taraz players
Russian expatriate footballers
Expatriate footballers in Kazakhstan
FC Amkar Perm players